The 1976 Wichita State Shockers football team was an American football team that represented  Wichita State as a member of the Missouri Valley Conference (MVC) during the 1976 NCAA Division I football season. In their third year under head coach Jim Wright, the team compiled an overall record of 4–7 with a mark of 2–2 in conference play, tying for third place in the MVC.

Schedule

References

Wichita State
Wichita State Shockers football seasons
Wichita State Shockers football